Radi Dikici (26 April 1937,  Samsun, Turkey – 26 Ocak 2021) was a Turkish writer known for his works in the history of the Roman and Byzantine empires. He studied political science at Ankara University and worked as an auditor, later as an administrator in the industry.

Works

Non-fiction
In Turkish
 This City Called Istanbul – The Ottoman’s Istanbul Adventure 1453-1924 (2002)
 This Byzantium of Ours: Byzantium 330-1453 (2007)
 The History of the Byzantine Empire: Byzantium 330-1453 (2013)
 Four Istanbul (2014)
 Understanding Byzantium (2016)
 Müzeyyen Senar's Legend (2017)
In English
 Empress Theodora (Everest Yayınları, 2011)
 Four Istanbuls (2015)
 The History of the Byzantine Empire: Byzantium 330-1453 (January 2016)

Fiction
 In Turkish
 Theodora (Remzi Kitabevi, 2009)
 Constantine the Great, Helena and Fausta (2011)
 Bizans Imparatoru Büyük Theodosius [Byzantine Emperor Thedosius the Great] (Remzi Kitabevi, 2013)
 Şans, Zafer ve… Emperor Heraclius (2015)

 In English
 Empress Theodora (Everest Yayinlari, 2011)

References

References:
1. Eğilmez Mahfi, Fatih, Fetih ve Bizans,29 May 2007
2.Akyol, Arzu, "Radi Dikici’yle evvel zaman Bizans," Akşam 15 March 2015
3. Chiadakis, Nikos reporter, author, "İn Hagia Sophis 'hide' the Timios Stafros of Jesus Christ. 17.April 2014.
4. Uluç, Hıcal, Aktüel, "Dördüncü Kuruluş ve Ayasofya, 01 March 2015.  
5. Kalmouki, Nikoleta, Greek Reporter, "Jesus True Cross in Hagia Sophia Researchers Claim" 17. April 2014. 
6. Tokuşoğlu, Nazenin,Habertürk, "Müzeyyen Senar'ın Biyografisinin yazarı Radi Dikici ile görüştük, 15 February 2015. 
7. Emrah, Barış, Vatan Kitap, "Dünyanın Kaderini değiştiren Büyük Konstantin'in Güzel Başkenti", 21 January 2014.
8. Taş Hakkı, Milliyet Kitap, "Bizans Üzerinden Osmanlı'yı Anlamak" Radi Dikici'nin "Şu Bizim Bizans Kitabı", June 2007.
9. Birkan, Şebnem, Cumhuriyet Kitap, "Radi Dikici'nin Şu Bizim Bizans'ı Üzerine- Roma İmparatorluğu'nun 1123 yılı, 06 September 2007
10.Yılmaz, Hadiye, Remzi Kitap, Radi Dikici: "Theodora'nın Cazibesine Kapıldım" dedi, June 2009. 
11.Karakoyunlu, Yılmaz , Habertürk, "Bir İstanbullu Theodora", 01 June 2009. 
12. Celal,Metin, Radi Dikici'nin " Cumhuriyet'in Divası Müzeyyen Senar, 26.September 2011. 
13. Erdil,Cengiz, Yeni Yüzyıl, "İstanbul'un Talanını Yazıyorum-1204", (I write An Anatomy of a Plunder-1204) 28 February 2016. 
14. Şengül,Yılmaz, Sözcü, Ünlü Sanatçı Müzeyyen Senar'ın Ulu Önder ile anıları Kitap Oldu-Radi Dikici, 17 February 2017.

Ankara University alumni
People from Samsun
Turkish writers